Kamakhya–Murkongselek Lachit Express  is an Express train belonging to Northeast Frontier Railway zone that runs between  and  in India. It is currently being operated with 05613/05614 train numbers on a daily basis.

Service

It averages 39 km/hr as 15613 Kamakhya–Murkongselek Intercity Express starts from  daily at 18:10 and covering 488 km in 12 hrs 35 mins & 40 km/hr as 05613/05614 Murkongselek–Kamakhya Intercity Express starts on Monday and Friday covering 832 km in 12 hrs 10 mins.

Route and halts 

 
 
 
 
 
 
 
 Gogamukh

Coach composition

The train consists of 17 coaches:
 1 AC II Tier
 2 AC III Tier
 8 Sleeper coaches
 3 General
 2 Second-class Luggage/parcel van

Traction

Both trains are hauled by a Guwahati Loco Shed or Malda Town Loco Shed-based WDM-3A diesel locomotive from Murkongselek to Guwahati and vice versa.

Direction reversal

The train reverses its direction once:

See also 

 Kamakhya Junction railway station
 Murkongselek railway station

Notes

References

External links 

15613/Kamakhya–Murkongselek Intercity Express
 15614/Murkongselek–Kamakhya Intercity Express

Transport in Guwahati
Rail transport in Assam
Railway services introduced in 2015
Intercity Express (Indian Railways) trains